Alex Aggelakos (Greek: Άλεξ Αγγελάκος; born September 6, 1994) is a Greek professional basketball player for Kavala of the Greek A2 Basket League. He is a 1.97 m tall swingman.

Professional career
Aggelakos began his professional career with the Greek club Kolossos Rodou. In 2014, he moved to the United Kingdom in order to study at Loughborough University. He also signed with the British club Leicester Riders. On August 26, 2015, he returned to Kolossos with a three-year contract. On July 9, 2018, Aggelakos signed a one-year extension with Kolossos.

Aggelakos spent the 2019-20 season with APOP Paphos of the Cypriot League, averaging 4.1 points, 1.9 rebounds and 1.3 assists per game. On October 7, 2020, he signed with Koroivos Amaliadas. On March 12, 2021, Aggelakos returned to Kolossos Rodou for a third stint with the team. On August 15, 2021, Aggelakos signed with Kavala.

References

External links
RealGM.com Profile
DraftExpress.com Profile
Eurobasket.com Profile

1994 births
Living people
Greek men's basketball players
Kolossos Rodou B.C. players
Leicester Riders players
Small forwards
Shooting guards
People from Rhodes